Pseudapistosia umber is a moth in the family Erebidae. It was described by Pieter Cramer in 1775. It is found in Panama, Colombia, Suriname, Ecuador and Peru.

References

Moths described in 1775
Phaegopterina
Arctiinae of South America
Taxa named by Pieter Cramer